A timeline of United States inventions (1946–1991) encompasses the ingenuity and innovative advancements of the United States within a historical context, dating from the era of the Cold War, which have been achieved by inventors who are either native-born or naturalized citizens of the United States. Copyright protection secures a person's right to his or her first-to-invent claim of the original invention in question, highlighted in Article I, Section 8, Clause 8 of the United States Constitution which gives the following enumerated power to the United States Congress:

In 1641, the first patent in North America was issued to Samuel Winslow by the General Court of Massachusetts for a new method of making salt. On April 10, 1790, President George Washington signed the Patent Act of 1790 (1 Stat. 109) into law which proclaimed that patents were to be authorized for "any useful art, manufacture, engine, machine, or device, or any improvement therein not before known or used." On July 31, 1790, Samuel Hopkins of Pittsford, Vermont became the first person in the United States to file and to be granted a patent for an improved method of "Making Pot and Pearl Ashes." The Patent Act of 1836 (Ch. 357, 5 Stat. 117) further clarified United States patent law to the extent of establishing a patent office where patent applications are filed, processed, and granted, contingent upon the language and scope of the claimant's invention, for a patent term of 14 years with an extension of up to an additional 7 years. However, the Uruguay Round Agreements Act of 1994 (URAA) changed the patent term in the United States to a total of 20 years, effective for patent applications filed on or after June 8, 1995, thus bringing United States patent law further into conformity with international patent law. The modern-day provisions of the law applied to inventions are laid out in Title 35 of the United States Code (Ch. 950, sec. 1, 66 Stat. 792).

From 1836 to 2011, the United States Patent and Trademark Office (USPTO) has granted a total of 7,861,317 patents relating to several well-known inventions appearing throughout the timeline below. Some examples of patented inventions between the years 1946 and 1991 include  William Shockley's transistor (1947), John Blankenbaker's personal computer (1971), Vinton Cerf's and Robert Kahn's Internet protocol/TCP (1973), and Martin Cooper's mobile phone (1973).

Cold War (1946–1991)

Post-war and the late 1940s (1946–1949)
1946 Space observatory

A space observatory is any instrument, such as a telescope, in outer space which is used for observation of distant planets, galaxies, and other outer space objects. In 1946, American theoretical astrophysicist Lyman Spitzer was proposed the idea of a telescope in outer space, a decade before the Soviet Union launched the first artificial satellite, Sputnik into orbit. However, German scientist Hermann Oberth had first conceived the idea of a space based telescope. Spitzer's proposal called for a large telescope that would not be hindered by Earth's atmosphere. After lobbying in the 1960s and 1970s for such a system to be built, Spitzer's vision ultimately materialized into the world's first space-based optical telescope, Hubble Space Telescope, which was launched on April 20, 1990 by the Space Shuttle Discovery (STS-31).

1946 Blowout preventer (annular)

An annular blowout preventer is a large valve that uses a wedge to seal off a wellhead. It has a donut-like rubber seal, known as an elastomeric packing unit, reinforced with steel ribs. During drilling or well interventions, the valve may be closed if overpressure from an underground zone causes formation fluids such as oil or natural gas to enter the wellbore and threaten the rig. The annular blowout preventer was invented by Granville Sloan Knox in 1946 who received a patent on September 9, 1952.

1946 Tupperware

Tupperware is airtight plastic containers used for the preparation, storage, containment, and serving of perishable food in the kitchen and home. Tupperware was invented in 1946 by American chemist Earl Silas Tupper who devised a method of purifying black polyethylene slag, a waste product produced in oil refinement, into a molded substance that was flexible, tough, non-porous, non-greasy and translucent. Available in many colors, the plastic containers with "burp seal" did not become a commercial success until Brownie Wise, a Florida housewife, began throwing Tupperware parties in 1951 in order to demonstrate the product and explain the features.

1946 Spoonplug

A spoonplug is a form of fishing lure. The spoonplug was invented by Elwood L. "Buck" Perry, then a physics and math teacher in Hickory, North Carolina. Elwood Perry combined science with a logical approach to fishing to create a "total fishing system." He is credited as being the father of structure fishing and was later inducted into the National Freshwater Fishing Hall of Fame.

1946 Chipper teeth

A chipper teeth is a variant of a saw chain used on a chainsaw. Using a tooth that is curled over the top of the chain, there are alternate teeth which point left and right. In 1946, American logger Joseph Buford Cox of Portland, Oregon invented chipper teeth, which is still widely used today and represents one of the biggest influences in the history of timber harvesting.

1946 Filament tape

Filament tape or strapping tape is a pressure-sensitive tape used for several packaging functions such as closing corrugated fiberboard boxes, reinforcing packages, bundling items, pallet utilizing, etc. It consists of a pressure-sensitive adhesive coated onto a backing material which is usually a polypropylene or polyester film and fiberglass filaments embedded to add high tensile strength. Filament tape was invented in 1946 by Cyrus Woodrow Bemmels. In 1949, it was placed on the market and was an immediate success.

1946 Credit card
 A credit card is part of a system of payments named after the small plastic card issued to users of the system. The issuer of the card grants a line of credit to the consumer from which the user can borrow money for payment to a merchant or as a cash advance to the user. In 1946, American banker John C. Biggins of the Flatbush National Bank of Brooklyn invented the first bank-issued credit card.

1946 Diaper (waterproof)
 A diaper or nappy is an absorbent garment for incontinent people. The dampless or waterproof diaper was invented in 1946 when Marion Donovan used a shower curtain from her bathroom to create the "Boater", the first re-usable and leak-proof diaper that contained plastic-lined cloth. Donovan's other innovation was replacing safety pins with plastic snaps on the sides of diapers. First sold in 1949 at Saks Fifth Avenue's flagship store in New York City, patents were later issued in 1951 to Donovan who later sold the rights to the waterproof diaper for $1 million.

1947 Transistor

In electronics, a transistor is a semiconductor device commonly used to amplify or switch electronic signals. Because the controlled output power can be much larger than the controlling input power, the transistor provides amplification of a signal. The transistor is the fundamental building block of all modern electronic devices, and is used in radio, telephone, computer, and other electronic systems. From November 17, 1947 to December 23, 1947, John Bardeen and Walter Brattain at AT&T Bell Labs, underwent experimentations and finally observed that when two gold point contacts were applied to a crystal of germanium, a signal was produced whereby the output power was larger than the input. The manager of the Bell Labs semiconductor research group, William Shockley, saw the potential in this and worked over the next few months greatly expanding the knowledge of semiconductors in order to construct the first point-contact transistor. Shockley is considered by many to be the "father" of the transistor. Hence, in recognition of his work, the transistor is widely, yet not universally acknowledged as the most important invention of the entire 20th century since it forms today's building blocks of processors found and used in almost every modern computing and electronics device. In recognition of their invention of the transistor, Shockley, Bardeen and Brattain were jointly awarded the 1956 Nobel Prize in Physics.

1947 Defibrillator

Defibrillation is the definitive treatment for the life-threatening cardiac arrhythmias, ventricular fibrillation and ventricular tachycardia. Defibrillation consists of delivering a therapeutic dose of electrical energy to the affected heart. Dr. Claude Beck invented the defibrillator in 1947.

1947 Supersonic aircraft

In aerodynamics, the sound barrier usually refers to the point at which an aircraft moves from transonic to supersonic speed. On October 14, 1947, just under a month after the United States Air Force had been created as a separate service, tests culminated in the first manned supersonic flight where the sound barrier was broken, piloted by Air Force Captain Chuck Yeager in the Bell X-1.

1947 Acrylic paint

Acrylic paint is fast-drying paint containing pigment suspended in an acrylic polymer emulsion. The first acrylic paint was invented by Leonard Bocour and Sam Golden in 1947 under the brand Magna paint.

1947 Magnetic particle clutch

A magnetic particle clutch is a special type of electromagnetic clutch which does not use friction plates. Instead, it uses a fine powder of magnetically susceptible material (typically stainless steel) to mechanically link an otherwise free wheeling disc attached to one shaft, to a rotor attached to the other shaft. The magnetic particle clutch was invented in 1947 by Ukrainian-American Jacob Rabinow.

1947 Instant camera
 Edwin H. Land invented the instant camera, with self-developing combined film and print that produced photographic images in 60 seconds. A colored photograph model would follow in the 1960s and eventually receive more than 500 patents for Land's innovations in light and plastic technologies.

1948 Windsurfing

Windsurfing, or sailboarding, is a surface water sport using a windsurf board, also commonly called a sailboard, usually two to five meters long and powered by wind pushing a sail. In 1948, 20-year-old Newman Darby was the first to conceive the idea of using a handheld sail and rig mounted on a universal joint so that he could control his small catamaran—the first rudderless sailboard ever built that allowed a person to steer by shifting his or her weight in order to tilt the sail fore and aft. Darby did not file for a patent for his invention. However, he is widely recognized as the inventor of the first sailboard.

1948 Hair spray

Hair spray is a beauty aqueous solution that is used to keep hair stiff or in a certain style. Weaker than hair gel, hair wax, or glue, it is sprayed to hold styles for a long period. Using a pump or aerosol spray nozzle, it sprays evenly over the hair. Hair spray was first invented and manufactured in 1948 by Chase Products Company, based in Broadview, Illinois.

1948 Cat litter
 Cat litter is one of any of a number of materials used in litter boxes to absorb moisture from cat feces and urine, which reduces foul odors such as ammonia and renders them more tolerable within the home. The first commercially available cat litter was Kitty Litter, available in 1948 and invented by Ed Lowe.

1948 Halligan bar
 A Halligan bar is a special forcible entry tool commonly used by firefighters and law enforcement. It was designed by and named after Hugh Halligan, a First Deputy Fire Chief in the New York City Fire Department, in 1948. While the tool was developed by a Deputy Chief of the New York City Fire Department, the department did not initially purchase it because of a perceived conflict of interest in buying from a member of the department.

1948 Hand dryer
 A hand dryer is an electric device found in a public restroom and are used to dry hands. It may either operate with a button, or more recently, automatically using an infrared sensor. The hand dryer was invented in 1948 by George Clemens.

1948 Rogallo wing

The Rogallo wing is a flexible type of airfoil composed of two partial conic surfaces with both cones pointing forward. Neither a kite, glider, or a type of aircraft, the Rogallo wing is most often seen in toy kites, but has been used to construct spacecraft parachutes during preliminary testing for NASA's Gemini program in the early 1960s, dirigible parachutes, ultralight powered aircraft like the trike, as well as hang gliders. Before the end of 1948, American aeronautical engineer Francis Rogallo had succeeded in inventing the first fully successful flexible-wing kite that he called the 'Flexi-Kite'. A patent was applied for in 1948 and granted in 1951. His wife,  Gertrude Rogallo, also made a significant impact upon the invention, having sewed the fabric into the required dimensions that used household items like kitchen curtains. Rogallo believed that flexible wings provided more stability than fixed surfaces, leading to an elimination of rigid spars during flight. Because of this, Rogallo's concepts are seen as classics examples of purity and efficiency in aviation.

1948 Cable television

Cable television provides television to consumers via radio frequency signals transmitted to televisions through fixed optical fibers or coaxial cables as opposed to the over-the-air method used in traditional television broadcasting. First known as Community Antenna Television or CATV, cable television was born in the mountains of Pennsylvania in 1948 by John Walson and Margaret Walson.

1948 Flying disc

Flying discs are disc-shaped objects thrown and caught for recreation, which are generally plastic and roughly 20 to 25 centimeters (8–10 inches) in diameter, with a lip. The shape of the disc, an airfoil in cross-section, allows it to fly by generating lift as it moves through the air while rotating. First known as the "Whirlo-Way", the flying disc was invented in 1949 by Walter Frederick Morrison who combined his fascination with invention and his interest in flight. Carved from a solid block of a plastic compound known as "Tenite," Morrison sold his flying disc invention to WHAM–O, which introduced it in 1957 as the "Pluto Platter." In 1958, WHAM–O modified the "Pluto Platter" and rebranded it as a Frisbee flying disc to the world. It became an instant sensation.

1948 Video game

A video game is an electronic game that involves interaction with a user interface to generate visual feedback on a video device. In 1948, ten years before William Higinbotham's Tennis for Two was developed, Thomas T. Goldsmith Jr. and Estle R. Mann co-patented the "Cathode-Ray Tube Amusement Device," making it the earliest documented video game. Primitive by modern standards in video gaming, the amusement device, however, required players to overlay pictures or illustrations of targets such as airplanes in front of the screen, dovetailing the game's action.

1949 Radiocarbon dating

Radiocarbon dating is a dating method that uses the naturally occurring radioisotope carbon-14 (14C) to determine the age of carbonaceous materials up to about 60,000 years. In 1949, Willard F. Libby invented the procedure for carbon-14 dating.

1949 Airsickness bag

An airsickness bag, also known as a barf bag, airsick bag, sick bag, or motion sickness bag, is a small bag commonly provided to passengers on board airplanes and boats to collect and contain vomit in the event of motion sickness. The airsickness bag was invented by Gilmore Schjeldahl in 1949 for Northwest Orient Airlines.

1949 Ice resurfacer

An ice resurfacer is a truck-like vehicle used to clean and smooth the surface of an ice rink. Frank J. Zamboni of Paramount, California invented the first ice resurfacer, which he called a Zamboni, in 1949.

1949 Atomic clock

An atomic clock uses an atomic resonance frequency standard as its timekeeping element. The first atomic clock was an ammonia maser device built in 1949 at the United States National Bureau of Standards.

1949 Holter monitor

A Holter monitor is a portable device for continuously monitoring the electrical activity of the heart for 24 hours or more. Sticky patches (electrodes) on the chest are connected to wires from the Holter monitor. The functions of a Holter monitor captures and records information such as heart rates during day and night, abnormal heart beats, and normal and abnormal heart rhythms. The Holter monitor was invented by Norman Holter.

1949 Crash test dummy

A crash test dummy is a full-scale anthropomorphic test device that simulates the dimensions, weight proportions and articulation of the human body, and is usually instrumented to record data about the dynamic behavior of the ATD in simulated vehicle impacts. Using human and animal cadaver research from earlier studies, the first artificial crash test dummy was an anthropomorphic dummy named "Sierra Sam". It was invented in 1949 by Samuel W. Alderson at his Alderson Research Labs (ARL) And Sierra Engineering Co. for the United States Air Force while conducting tests on aircraft ejection seats, pilot restraint harnesses, and aviation helmets. Alderson's early dummies and those of his competitors were fairly primitive, with no pelvic structure and little spinal articulation. With American automakers interested in durable crash test dummies that could be tested and retested while yielding back a broad spectrum of data during simulated automobile crashes, the first crash test dummy used for automative testing was again invented by Samuel Alderson in 1968. It was called the V.I.P. (Very Important Person) and it was built with dimensions of an average adult man coupled with a steel rib cage, articulated joints, a flexible neck, and a lumbar spine.

1949 Compiler

A compiler is a computer program or set of programs that transforms source code written in a computerized source  language into another computer language often having a binary form known as an object code. The most common reason for wanting to transform source code is to create an executable program. The first compiler written for the A-0 programming language is attributed to its inventor, Grace Hopper in 1949.

1949 Aerosol paint
 Aerosol paint, also called spray paint, is a type of paint that comes in a sealed pressurized container and is released in a fine spray mist when depressing a valve button. A form of spray painting, aerosol paint leaves a smooth, evenly coated surface, unlike many rolled or brushed paints. In 1949, Ed Seymour of Sycamore, Illinois invented aerosol paint, which he based on the same principle as spray deodorizers and insecticides. The conveyance featured a small can of paint packaged with an aerosol propellant and fitted with a spray head.

1950s
1950 Artificial snowmaking

Snowmaking is the artificial production of snow by forcing water and pressurized air through a "snow gun" or "snow cannon", on ski slopes. Snowmaking is mainly used at ski resorts to supplement natural snow. This allows ski resorts to improve the reliability of their snow cover and to extend their ski seasons. The costly production of snowmaking requires low temperatures. The threshold temperature for snowmaking decreases as humidity decreases. Machine-made snow was first co-invented by three engineers—Art Hunt, Dave Richey and Wayne Pierce of Milford, Connecticut on March 14, 1950. Their patented invention of the first "snow cannon" used a garden hose, a 10-horsepower compressor, and a spray-gun nozzle, which produced about 20 inches of snow.

1950 Hamming code
 In telecommunication, a Hamming code is a linear error-correcting code. Hamming codes can detect up to two simultaneous bit errors, and correct single-bit errors; thus, reliable communication is possible when the Hamming distance between the transmitted and received bit patterns is less than or equal to one. By contrast, the simple parity code cannot correct errors, and can only detect an odd number of errors. Hamming codes are of fundamental importance in coding theory and remain of practical use in modern computer design. Hamming codes were invented in 1950 by Richard Hamming at Bell Labs.

1950 Teleprompter

A teleprompter is a display device that prompts the person speaking with an electronic visual text of a speech or script. Using a teleprompter is similar to the practice of using cue cards. The screen is in front of and usually below the lens of the camera, and the words on the screen are reflected to the eyes of the performer using a sheet of clear glass or specially prepared beam splitter. The teleprompter was invented in 1950 by Hubert Schlafly, who was working at 20th Century Fox film studios in Los Angeles.

1950 Sengstaken-Blakemore tube

A Sengstaken-Blakemore tube is an oro or nasogastric tube used occasionally in the management of upper gastrointestinal hemorrhage due to bleeding from esophageal varices which are distended veins in the esophageal wall, usually as a result of cirrhosis. It consists of a gastric balloon, an esophageal balloon, and a gastric suction port. The Sengstaken-Blakemore tube was invented by Dr. Robert W. Sengstaken and Dr. Arthur H. Blakemore in 1950.

1951 Stellarator
 A stellarator is a device used to confine a hot plasma with magnetic fields in order to sustain a controlled nuclear fusion reaction. It is the earliest controlled fusion device. In 1951, American astrophysicist Lyman Spitzer recommended that the United States Atomic Energy Commission commence containing and harnessing nuclear fusion of hydrogen at temperatures exceeding those at the Sun's surface. To do this, Spitzer invented a plasma confinement configuration device called the stellarator.

1951 Cooler
 A cool box, cooler, portable ice chest, chilly bin, or esky most commonly is an insulated box used to keep perishable food or beverages cool. Ice cubes, which are very cold, are most commonly placed in it to make the things inside stay cool. Ice packs are sometimes used, as they either contain the melting water inside, or have a gel sealed inside that also stays cold longer than plain water. The cooler was invented in 1951 by Richard C. Laramy of Joliet, Illinois. Laramy filed a patent for the cooler on February 24, 1951, and was issued U.S. patent #2,663,157 on December 22, 1953.

1951 Wetsuit
 A wetsuit is a garment, usually made of foamed neoprene, which is worn by divers, windsurfers, canoeists, and others engaged in water sports, providing thermal insulation, abrasion resistance and buoyancy. The insulation properties depend on bubbles of gas enclosed within the material, which reduce its ability to conduct heat. The bubbles also give the wetsuit a low density, providing buoyancy in water. The wetsuit was invented in 1951 by the University of California at Berkeley physicist Hugh Bradner.

1951 Correction fluid
 Correction fluid is an opaque, white fluid applied to paper to mask errors in text. It was very important when material was typed with a typewriter, but has become less so since the advent of the word processor. Correction fluid was invented by Bette Nesmith Graham in 1951. Originally called by the brand name "Mistake Out", Graham began selling correction fluid in 1956.

1951 Well counter
 A well counter is a device used for measuring radioactivity in small samples. It usually employs a sodium iodide crystal detector. It was invented in 1951 by American electrical engineer and biophysicist Hal Anger. Anger filed U.S. patent #2,779,876 on March 3, 1953 for his "Radio-Activity Distribution Detector" which was later issued on January 29, 1957.

1952 Airbag

An air bag is a safety feature designed to protect automobile passengers in a head-on collision. Most cars today have driver's side airbags and many have one on the passenger side as well. Located in the steering wheel assembly on the driver's side and in the dashboard on the passenger side, the air bag device responds within milliseconds of a crash. The original safety cushion was first created by John W. Hetrick in 1952. After a car accident that his family was involved in, Hetrick drew sketches of compressed air stored in a container. When a spring-loaded weight senses the car decelerating at a rapid enough rate, it opens a valve that allows the pressure in the container to fill a bag. With this knowledge, he developed his design until he was able to obtain a patent on the device on August 5, 1952. Later in 1967, Dr. Allen S. Breed invented and developed a key component for automotive use in 1967, the ball-in-tube inertial sensor for crash detection. Breed Corporation then marketed this innovation to Chrysler.

1952 Bread clip

A bread clip is a device used to hold plastic bags, such as the ones pre-sliced bread is commonly packaged in, closed. They are also commonly called bread tags, bread tabs, bread ties, bread crimps, or bread-bag clips. By sealing a bag more securely than tying or folding over its open end, the clip or tie may preserve its contents longer. The bread clip was invented in 1952 by Floyd Paxton of Yakima, Washington. Paxton never patented the device.

1952 Barcode

A barcode is an optical machine-readable representation of data, which shows certain data on certain products. Originally, barcodes represented data in the widths (lines) and the spacings of parallel lines, and may be referred to as linear or one-dimensional barcodes or symbologies. They also come in patterns of squares, dots, hexagons and other geometric patterns within images termed two-dimensional matrix codes or symbologies. Norman Joseph Woodland is best known for inventing the barcode for which he received a patent in October 1952.

1952 Artificial heart

An artificial heart is implanted into the body to replace the biological heart. On July 3, 1952, 41-year-old Henry Opitek suffering from shortness of breath made medical history at Harper University Hospital at Wayne State University in Michigan. The Dodrill-GMR heart, considered to be the first operational mechanical heart, was invented by Dr. Forest Dewey Dodrill and successfully inserted into Henry Opitek while performing open heart surgery. In 1981, Dr. Robert Jarvik implanted the world's first permanent artificial heart, the Jarvik 7, into Dr. Barney Clark. The heart, powered by an external compressor, kept Clark alive for 112 days. The Jarvik heart was not banned for permanent use. Since 1982, more than 350 people have received the Jarvik heart as a bridge to transplantation.

1953 Heart-lung machine
 Dr. John Heysham Gibbon performed the first successful cardiopulmonary bypass surgery in which the blood was artificially circulated and oxygenated by using his invention, a pump known as the heart-lung machine. This new medical technology, which allowed the surgeon to operate on a dry and motionless heart by maintaining the circulation of blood and the oxygen content of the body, greatly increased surgical treatment options for heart defects and disease.

1953 Voltmeter (digital)
 A voltmeter is an instrument used for measuring electrical potential difference between two points in an electric circuit. Analog voltmeters move a pointer across a scale in proportion to the voltage of the circuit; digital voltmeters give a numerical display of voltage by use of an analog-to-digital converter. The digital voltmeter was invented in 1953 by Andrew Kay, founder of Kaypro.

1953 Marker pen
 A marker pen, marking pen, felt-tip pen, or marker, is a pen which has its own colored ink-source, and usually a tip made of a porous material, such as felt or nylon. Sidney Rosenthal, from Richmond Hill, New York, is credited with inventing the marker in 1953.

1953 WD-40
 WD-40 is a widely available water-displacing spray that is useful in both home and commercial fields; lubricating and loosening joints and hinges, removing dirt and residue, and extricating stuck screws and bolts are common usages. The product also may be useful in displacing moisture, as this is its original purpose and design intent. WD-40 was invented in 1953 by Norm Larsen and two other employees at the Rocket Chemical Company in San Diego, California.

1953 Apgar scale
 The Apgar scale is used to determine the physical status of an infant at birth. The Apgar scale is administered to a newborn at one minute after birth and five minutes after birth. It scores the baby's heart rate, respiration, muscle tone, reflex response, and color. This test quickly alerts medical personnel that the newborn needs assistance. This simple, easy-to-perform test was invented in 1953 by Dr. Virginia Apgar, a professor of anesthesia at the New York Columbia-Presbyterian Medical Center.

1953 Gilhoolie
 A gilhoolie is a kitchen appliance that opens jars and bottles. It was invented by Dr. C. W. Fuller in 1953.

1953 Wheel clamp
 A wheel clamp, also known as a Denver boot or wheel boot, is a device that is designed to prevent vehicles from moving. In its most common form, it consists of a clamp which surrounds a vehicle wheel, designed to prevent removal of both itself and the wheel. Wheel clamps are used in order to enforce laws against unauthorized or illegal parking, in lieu of towing the offending vehicle, and for security purposes such as a deterrent against stolen vehicles by thieves. Originally known as the auto immobilizer, the wheel clamp or Denver boot was invented in 1953 by Frank Marugg of Denver Colorado. A patent was filed on May 7, 1955, and issued three years later on July 28, 1958.

1953 Wiffle ball
 Wiffleball is a variation of the sport of baseball designed for indoor or outdoor play in confined areas. The game is played using a perforated, light-weight, hollow, rubbery plastic ball and a long, hollow, plastic and typically a yellow bat. The Wiffle ball was invented by David N. Mullany of Fairfield, Connecticut, in 1953 when he designed a ball that curved easily for his 12-year-old son. It was named when his son and his friends would refer to a strikeout as a "whiff".

1953 Maser
 A maser is produces coherent electromagnetic waves through amplification due to stimulated emission. Historically the term came from the acronym "Microwave Amplification by Stimulated Emission of Radiation". Charles H. Townes, James P. Gordon, and Herbert J. Zeiger built the first maser at Columbia University in 1953.

1953 Carbonless copy paper
 Carbonless copy paper is an alternative to carbon paper, used to make a copy of an original, handwritten document without the use of any electronics. Carbonless copy paper was invented by chemists Lowell Schleicher and Barry Green, working for the NCR Corporation, as a biodegradable, stain-free alternative to carbon paper.

1953 Crossed-field amplifier
 A crossed-field amplifier (CFA) is a specialized vacuum tube frequently used as a microwave amplifier in very-high-power transmitters. A CFA has lower gain and bandwidth than other microwave amplifier tubes, but it is more efficient and capable of much higher output power. William C. Brown is considered to have invented the first crossed-field amplifier in 1953 which he called an Amplitron.

1954 Zipper storage bag

A zipper storage bag is a plastic bag with a sealed or zipped opening that allows for transparent viewing of stored items inside the bag. Better known under the brand name and genericized trademark Ziploc, zipper storage bags are commonly used to hold perishable foods and snacks. Zipper storage bags were patented by Robert W. Vergobbi on May 18, 1954. However, they would not be introduced to consumers until 1968, when Dow Chemical introduced the Ziploc bags.

1954 TV dinner

A TV dinner is a prepackaged, frozen or chilled meal generally in an individual package. It requires little preparation, oven baked or microwaveable, and contains all the elements for a single-serving meal in a tray with compartments for the food. Carl A. Swanson of C.A. Swanson & Sons is generally credited for inventing the TV dinner. Retired Swanson executive Gerry Thomas said he conceived the idea after the company found itself with a huge surplus of frozen turkeys because of poor Thanksgiving sales.

1954 Acoustic suspension loudspeaker
 The acoustic suspension woofer is a type of loudspeaker that reduces bass distortion caused by non-linear, stiff mechanical suspensions in conventional loudspeakers. The acoustic suspension loudspeaker was invented in 1954 by Edgar Villchur, and brought to commercial production by Villchur and Henry Kloss with the founding of Acoustic Research in Cambridge Massachusetts.

1954 Model rocketry
 A model rocket is a small rocket that is commonly advertised as being able to be launched by anybody, to generally low altitudes, usually to around 300–1500 feet, and recovered by a variety of means. Popular among children and amateurs, model rocketry is considered a hobby. In 1954, licensed pyrotechnics expert Orville Carlisle along with his brother Robert, designed the first model rocket and model rocket motor.

1954 Door (automatic sliding)
 Automatic sliding doors are open and closed either by power, spring, or by a sensor. This eliminates the need for a person to open or close a door by turning a doorknob or pressing up against a bar on the door itself. Automatic sliding doors are commonly found at entrance and exits of supermarkets, department stores, and airport terminals. In 1954, Dee Horton and Lew Hewitt co-invented the automatic sliding door.

1954 Mogen clamp
 The Mogen clamp is a surgical tool used to circumcise a human male's penis. The device is designed to remove the foreskin, while protecting the glans. The Mogen clamp was invented in 1954 by Rabbi Harry Bronstein, a Brooklyn, New York mohel. For many years it was used only in Jewish ritual circumcision in a ceremony called a bris. In more recent years though, American physicians are using the clamp more frequently in medical settings for newborn circumcision.

1954 Cardiopulmonary resuscitation
 Cardiopulmonary resuscitation is an important life saving first aid skill, practiced throughout the world. It is the only known effective method of keeping someone who has suffered cardiac arrest alive long enough for definitive treatment to be delivered. In 1954, James Elam was the first to demonstrate experimentally that cardiopulmonary resuscitation (CPR) was a sound technique, and together with Dr. Peter Safar he demonstrated its superiority to previous methods.

1954 Active noise control

 Active noise control, also known as noise cancellation, is a method for reducing unwanted sound through the addition of a second sound specifically designed to cancel the first. Active noise cancelling headphones were invented by Lawrence J. Fogel, an aerospace engineer working to improve communication in helicopter cockpits, with a patent filed April 2, 1954. His research led to the first five patents in noise cancellation for headphones between 1954-1961.

1954 Synthetic diamond
 Synthetic diamonds are diamonds produced in a technological process as opposed to natural diamonds, which are created in geological processes. Synthetic diamonds are also widely known as HPHT diamonds or CVD diamonds, HPHT and CVD being the production methods, high-pressure high-temperature synthesis and chemical vapor deposition, respectively. Although the concept of producing high quality artificial diamonds is an old one, the reproducible synthesis of diamonds is not. In 1954, Howard Tracy Hall at the GE Research Laboratory invented a belt press in the shape of a doughnut, which confined the sample chamber and two curved, tapered pistons to apply pressure on the chamber in order to produce the first commercially successful and reproducible synthesis of a diamond.

1954 Radar gun
 A radar gun or speed gun is a small Doppler radar used to detect the speed of objects. It relies on the Doppler Effect applied to a radar beam to measure the speed of objects at which it is pointed. Radar guns may be hand-held or vehicle-mounted. Bryce K. Brown invented the radar gun in March 1954.

1955 Sling lift

A sling lift is an assistive device that allows patients in hospitals and nursing homes and those receiving home health care to be transferred between a bed and a chair or other similar resting places, using hydraulic power. Sling lifts are used for patients whose mobility is limited. The sling lift was patented on April 12, 1955 by Ronald R. Stratton in what he called a "floor crane with adjustable legs".

1955 Crosby-Kugler capsule

A Crosby-Kugler capsule is a device used for obtaining biopsies of small bowel mucosa, necessary for the diagnosis of various small bowel diseases. It was invented by Dr. William Holmes Crosby, Jr. in 1955.

1955 Nuclear submarine

The USS Nautilus, the world's first nuclear submarine, revolutionized naval warfare. Conventional submarines need two engines: a diesel engine to travel on the surface and an electric engine to travel submerged, where oxygen for a diesel engine is not available. By relying on nuclear capability, the USS Nautilus could travel uninterrupted for thousands of miles below the surface with a single fuel charge. Beginning in 1951, Admiral Hyman Rickover can be credited for the design of the world's first nuclear submarine who led and oversaw a group of scientists and engineers at the Naval Reactors Branch of the Atomic Energy Commission. After sea trials were conducted and testing was completed, the USS Nautilus became fully operational in January 1955.

1955 Hard disk drive
 A hard disk drive, or hard drive, hard disk, or fixed disk drive, is a non-volatile storage device which stores digitally encoded data on rapidly rotating platters with magnetic surfaces. The hard disk drive was invented by Reynold Johnson and commercially introduced in 1956 with the IBM 305 RAMAC computer.

1955 Harmonic drive
 A harmonic drive is a special type of mechanical gear system that can improve certain characteristics compared to traditional gearing systems. The harmonic drive was invented in 1955 by Walton Musser. U.S. patent #2,906,143 was filed on March 21, 1955 and issued to Musser on September 29, 1959.

1955 Vibrating sample magnetometer
 A vibrating sample magnetometer or VSM is a scientific instrument that measures magnetic properties where the sample is then physically vibrated sinusoidally, typically through the use of a piezoelectric material. It was invented in 1955 by American physicist Simon Foner at the MIT Lincoln Laboratory in Cambridge, Massachusetts. Foner filed U.S. patent #2,946,948 on June 20, 1957. It was issued on July 26, 1960.

1956 Lint roller

A lint roller or lint remover is a roll of one-sided adhesive paper on a cardboard or plastic barrel that is mounted on a central spindle, with an attached handle. The device facilitates the removal of lint or other small fibers from most materials such as clothing, upholstery and linen. The lint roller was co-invented in 1956 by American electrical engineer Nicholas McKay and his wife Helen.

1956 Kart racing

Kart racing or karting is a variant of an open-wheel motor sport with simple, small four-wheeled vehicles called karts, go-karts, or gearbox karts depending on the design. Karts vary widely in speed and some can reach speeds exceeding 160 mph, while go-karts intended for the general public in amusement parks may be limited to speeds of no more than 15 mph. In the summer of 1956, hot rod veteran Art Ingels built the first go-kart out of old car frame tubing, welding beads, and a lawnmower motor, not realizing that he had invented a new sport and form of auto racing.

1956 Industrial robot

An industrial robot is an automatically controlled, re-programmable, multipurpose manipulator programmable in three or more axes. The first to invent an industrial robot was George Devol and Joseph F. Engelberger.

1956 Operating system (batch processing) 

An operating system (OS) is software (programs and data) that runs on computers and manages the computer hardware and provides common services for efficient execution of various application software. For hardware functions such as input and output and memory allocation, the operating system acts as an intermediary between application programs and the computer hardware, although the application code is usually executed directly by the hardware, but will frequently call the OS or be interrupted by it. Operating systems are found on almost any device that contains a computer—from cellular phones and video game consoles to supercomputers and web servers. The GM-NAA I/O, created by Owen Mock and Bob Patrick of General Motors Research Laboratories in early 1956 (or late 1955) for their IBM 701 mainframe computer is generally considered to be the first "batch processing" operating system and possibly the first "real" operating system. Rudimentary forms of operating systems existed before batch processing, the Input/Output Control System (IOCS) being one example. However, what specifically differentiated and made the GM-NAA I/O as the first of its kind was that instead of having a human operator manually load each program as what previous systems were only capable of doing, computerized software as used on GM-NAA I/O, thereafter handled the scheduling, management, and multi-tasking of all computer applications.

1956 Fortran
 Fortran is a general-purpose, procedural, and imperative programming language that is especially suited to numeric computation and scientific computing. Fortran came to dominate this area of programming early on and has been in continual use for over half a century in computationally intensive areas such as numerical weather prediction, finite element analysis, computational fluid dynamics (CFD), computational physics, and computational chemistry. It is one of the most popular languages in the area of High-performance computing and programs to benchmark and rank the world's fastest supercomputers are written in Fortran. In 1956, John Backus and a team of researchers at IBM invented the Fortran programming language for the IBM 704 mainframe computer.

1956 Videotape
 Videotape is a means of recording images and sound onto magnetic tape as opposed to movie film. The first practical professional videotape machines were the Quadruplex videotape machines introduced by Ampex on April 14, 1956. Invented by Charles Ginsburg and Ray Dolby, Quad employed a transverse four-head system on a two-inch (5.08 cm) tape, and linear heads for the soundtrack.

1956 Particle storage ring
 A storage ring is a type of circular particle accelerator in which a continuous or pulsed particle beam may be kept circulating for a long period of time, up to many hours. Gerard K. O'Neill invented the first particle storage ring in 1956.

1957 Skid-steer loader

A skid loader or skid steer loader is a small rigid frame, engine-powered machine with lift arms used to attach a wide variety of labor-saving tools or attachments. Though sometimes they are equipped with tracks, skid-steer loaders are typically four-wheel drive vehicles that can push material from one location to another, carry material in its bucket, or load material into a truck or trailer. Brothers Louis and Cyrill Keller co-invented the first skid-steer loader, which was based around a three-wheeled loader they developed in 1957 for a turkey farmer near Rothsay, Minnesota. In September 1958, they were hired by the Melroe brothers at Melroe Manufacturing Company in Gwinner, North Dakota, which was later to become Bobcat Company. Using the brothers' design, Melroe introduced the M60 Self-Propelled Loader and, in 1960, Louis added a rear drive axle, resulting in the M400 model, the world's first true skid-steer loader.

1957 Laser

A laser is a device that emits electromagnetic radiation through a process called stimulated emission. Laser light is usually spatially coherent, which means that the light either is emitted in a narrow, low-divergence beam, or can be converted into one with the help of optical components such as lenses. Lasers are used to read compact discs and bar codes, guide missiles, remove ulcers, fabricate steel, precisely measure the distance from Earth to the Moon, record ultradefined images of brain tissue, entertain people in light shows and do thousands of other things. In 1957, American physicist Gordon Gould first theorized the idea and use of laser technology. Despite a 20-year battle with the United States Patent and Trademark Office, Gould is now widely associated as the original inventor of laser. In addition, Charles H. Townes and Arthur L. Schawlow, scientists at Bell Laboratories, wrote a paper, Infrared and Optical Masers in 1958 that was enormously influential on the theory of lasers. Ironically, Gould, Townes, or Schawlow never built the first working laser. On July 7, 1960, American physicist Theodore H. Maiman created and built the first laser. The core of his laser consisted of a man-made ruby as the active medium, a material that had been judged unsuitable by other scientists who rejected crystal cores in favor of various gases.

1957 Confocal microscopy
 Confocal microscopy is an optical imaging technique used to increase micrograph contrast and to reconstruct three-dimensional images by using a spatial pinhole to eliminate out-of-focus light or flare in specimens that are thicker than the focal plane. This technique has gained popularity in the scientific and industrial communities. Typical applications include life sciences and semiconductor inspection. The principle of confocal imaging was invented and patented by Marvin Minsky in 1957.

1957 Sugar packet
 A sugar packet is a delivery method for one 'serving' of sugar. Sugar packets are commonly supplied in restaurants and coffee bars in preference to sugar bowls or sugar dispensers for reasons of neatness, spill control, and to some extent portion control. In 1957, the sugar packet that consisted of a granulated low-calorie sugar substitute, was invented by Benjamin Eisenstadt, the founder of Cumberland Packing or better known today as the Sweet 'N Low company.

1957 Air-bubble packing

Better known by the brand name of Bubble Wrap, air-bubble packing is a pliable transparent plastic material commonly used for the cushioning of fragile, breakable items in order to absorb or minimize shock and vibration. Regularly spaced, the protruding air-filled hemispheres are known as "bubbles" which are 1/4 inch (6 millimeters) in diameter, to as large as an inch (26 millimeters) or more. Air-bubble packing was co-invented by Alfred Fielding and Marc Chavannes in 1957.

1957 Borazon

Borazon, a boron nitride allotrope, is the fourth hardest substance, after aggregated diamond nanorods, ultrahard fullerite, and diamond, and the third hardest artificial material. Borazon is a crystal created by heating equal quantities of boron and nitrogen at temperatures greater than 1800 °Celsius, 3300 °Fahrenheit at 7 gigapascal 1 millionpound-force per square inch. Borazon was first invented in 1957 by Robert H. Wentorf, Jr., a physical chemist working for the General Electric Company. In 1969, General Electric adopted the name Borazon as its trademark for the crystal.

1957 Gamma camera

A gamma camera is a device used to image gamma radiation emitting radioisotopes, a technique known as scintigraphy. The applications of scintigraphy include early drug development and nuclear medical imaging to view and analyse images of the human body of the distribution of medically injected, inhaled, or ingested radionuclides emitting gamma rays. The gamma camera was invented by Hal Anger in 1957.

1957 Cryotron
 The cryotron is a switch that operates using superconductivity. The cryotron works on the principle that magnetic fields destroy superconductivity. The cryotron was invented by Dudley Allen Buck in 1957.

1958 Doppler fetal monitor
 A heartbeat doppler, also called a doppler fetal monitor or doppler fetal heartbeat monitor, is a handheld device which uses ultrasound to identify fetal heartbeat as part of the prenatal health care measures. The doppler fetal monitor was invented in 1958 by American obstetrician Dr. Edward H. Hon.

1958 Cable tie
 A cable tie, also known as a zip tie or tie-wrap, is a type of fastener, especially for binding several electronic cables or wires together and to organize cables and wires. They have also been commonly used as makeshift handcuffs, particularly in the United States, the United Kingdom, and in Panama. The cable tie, originally known as the Ty-Rap, was invented in 1958 by Maurus C. Logan, who worked for many years at Thomas & Betts. Logan filed U.S. patent #3,022,557 on June 24, 1958 which was issued to him on February 27, 1962.

1958 Lisp programming language
 Lisp is a family of computer programming languages with a long history and a distinctive, fully parenthesized syntax. Originally specified in 1958, Lisp is the second-oldest high-level programming language in widespread use today where Fortran is the oldest. It was invented by John McCarthy in 1958.

1958 Carbon fiber
 Carbon fiber is a material consisting of extremely thin fibers about 0.005–0.010 mm in diameter and composed mostly of carbon atoms. In 1958, Dr. Roger Bacon invented the first high-performance carbon fibers at the Union Carbide Parma Technical Center, located outside of Cleveland, Ohio.

1958 Integrated circuit

An integrated circuit is a miniaturized electronic circuit that has been manufactured in the surface of a thin substrate of semiconductor material. Integrated circuits are used in almost all electronic equipment in use today and have revolutionized the world of electronics. The integration of large numbers of tiny transistors into a small chip was an enormous improvement over the manual assembly of circuits using discrete electronic components. On September 12, 1958, Jack Kilby developed a piece of germanium with an oscilloscope attached. While pressing a switch, the oscilloscope showed a continuous sine wave, proving that his integrated circuit worked. A patent for a "Solid Circuit made of Germanium", the first integrated circuit, was filed by its inventor, Jack Kilby on February 6, 1959.
1958Video Game
The first video game was invented by American Physicist William Higinbotham-a simple tennis game.
1959 Fusor

The fusor is an apparatus invented by Philo T. Farnsworth in 1959 to create nuclear fusion. Unlike most controlled fusion systems, which slowly heat a magnetically confined plasma, the fusor injects "high temperature" ions directly into a reaction chamber, thereby avoiding a considerable amount of complexity. The approach is known as inertial electrostatic confinement.

1959 Weather satellite
 A weather satellite is a type of satellite that is primarily used to monitor the weather and climate of the Earth. The first weather satellite, Vanguard 2, was launched on February 17, 1959, although the first weather satellite to be considered a success was TIROS-1, launched by NASA on April 1, 1960.

1959 Spandex
 Spandex is a synthetic fiber known for its exceptional elasticity that is typically worn as apparel for exercising and in gymnastics. Spandex is stronger and more durable than rubber, its major non-synthetic competitor. Spandex was invented in 1959 by DuPont chemist Joseph Shivers.

1960s
1960 Child safety seat
 A child safety seat (sometimes referred to as an infant safety seat, a child restraint system, a restraint car seat, or ambiguously as car seats), are seats designed specifically to protect children from injury or death during collisions. They are commonly used by children when riding in a vehicle. In 1960, Leonard Rivkin of Denver, Colorado invented the first child safe car seat for use in vehicles equipped with bucket seats. A patent was filed on March 5, 1962 and was issued on October 22, 1963.

1960 Artificial turf
 Artificial turf, or synthetic turf, is a man-made surface made to look like natural grass. It is most often used in arenas for sports that were originally or are normally played on grass. In 1960, David Chaney is the man long credited with inventing the first generation of artificial grass turfs. Artificial turf then had its commercial birth in 1965 when it was installed at the Reliant Astrodome, a stadium in Houston, Texas.

1960 Magnetic stripe card
 A magnetic stripe card is a type of card capable of storing data by modifying the magnetism of tiny iron-based magnetic particles on a band of magnetic material on the card. The magnetic stripe, sometimes called a magstripe, is read by physical contact and swiping past a reading head. Magnetic stripe cards are commonly used in credit cards, identity cards such as a driver's license, and transportation tickets. The magnetic stripe card was invented in 1960 by IBM engineer Forrest Parry, who conceived the idea of incorporating a piece of magnetic tape in order to store secured information and data to a plastic card base.

1960 Global navigation satellite system

A global navigation satellite system (GNSS) provides autonomous geo-spatial positioning with global coverage. A GNSS allows small electronic receivers to determine their location such as longitude, latitude, and altitude to within a few meters using time signals transmitted along a line of sight by radio from satellites in outer space. Receivers on the ground with a fixed position can also be used to calculate the precise time as a reference for scientific experiments. The first such system was Transit, developed by the Johns Hopkins University Applied Physics Laboratory under the leadership of Richard Kershner. Development of the system for the United States Navy began in 1958, and a prototype satellite,Transit 1A, was launched in September 1959. That satellite failed to reach orbit. A second satellite, Transit 1B, was successfully launched April 13, 1960 by a Thor-Ablestar rocket. The last Transit satellite launch was in August 1988.

1960 Combined oral contraceptive pill

The combined oral contraceptive pill, or birth-control pill, or simply "the Pill", is a combination of an estrogen and a progestin taken orally to inhibit normal female fertility. On May 9, 1960, the FDA announced it would approve Enovid 10 mg for contraceptive use. By the time Enovid 10 mg had been in general use for three years, at least a half a million women had used it. Beginning his research and studies in the feasibility of women's fertility in 1950, Dr. Gregory Pincus invented the combined oral contraceptive pill in 1960.

1960 Obsidian hydration dating

Obsidian hydration dating is a geochemical method of determining age in either absolute or relative terms of an artifact made of obsidian. Obsidian hydration dating was introduced in 1960 by Irving Friedman and Robert Smith of the United States Geological Survey.

1960 Gas laser

A gas laser is a laser in which an electric current is discharged through a gas to produce light. The first gas laser, the Helium-neon, was invented by William R. Bennett, Don Herriott, and Ali Javan in 1960. The first continuous visible gas laser, operating at 632.8 nm in the red, was invented by A. D. White and J. D. Rigden in 1962.

1961 Spreadsheet (electronic)
 An electronic spreadsheet organizes data information into computerized software defined columns and rows. Primarily used for business and accounting purposes, the data can then be "added up" by a formula to give a total or sum. The spreadsheet program summarizes information from many paper sources in one place and presents the information in a format to help a decision maker see the financial "big picture" of a company. Spreadsheets in paper format have been used by accountants for hundreds of years. However, computerized, electronic spreadsheets are of much more recent origin. In 1961, Richard Mattessich, a professor at the University of California at Berkeley, pioneered the concept of electronic spreadsheets for use in business accounting. In the autumn of 1978, Harvard Business School student, Dan Bricklin, came up with the idea for an interactive visible calculator. Bricklin and Bob Frankston then co-invented the software program VisiCalc, the world's first "killer application" and electronic spreadsheet for use on personal computers.

1961 Wearable computer
 Wearable computers are computers which can be worn on the body. Wearable computers are especially useful for applications that require computational support while the user's hands, voice, eyes or attention are actively engaged with the physical environment. The wearable computer was first conceived by American mathematician Edward O. Thorp in 1955 and co-invented with American electronic engineer Claude Shannon.

1961 Frozen carbonated beverage
 A frozen carbonated beverage is a mixture of flavored sugar syrup, carbon dioxide, and water that is frozen by a custom machine creating a drink consisting of a fine slush of suspended ice crystals, with very little liquid. In 1961, Omar Knedlik of Coffeyville, Kansas invented the first frozen carbonated drink machine and is thus recognized as the inventor of the frozen carbonated beverage. In 1965, 7-Eleven licensed the machine, and began selling Knedlik's invention by the brand name popularly known as Slurpee.

1961 Biofeedback
 Biofeedback is a form of alternative medicine that involves measuring a subject's quantifiable bodily functions such as blood pressure, heart rate, skin temperature, sweat gland activity, and muscle tension, conveying the information to the patient in real-time. This raises the patient's awareness and conscious control of his or her unconscious physiological activities. Neal Miller is generally considered the father of modern-day biofeedback. Miller theorized the basic principles of biofeedback by applying his theory that classical and operant conditioning were both the result of a common learning principle in 1961. Miller hypothesized that any measurable physiological behavior within the human body would respond in some way to voluntary control.

1962 Communications satellite
 A communications satellite is an artificial satellite stationed in space for the purposes of telecommunications. Modern communications satellites use a variety of orbits. For fixed point-to-point services, communications satellites provide a microwave radio relay technology complementary to that of submarine communication cables. Invented in 1962 by the American aerospace engineer John Robinson Pierce, NASA launched Telstar, the world's first active communications satellite, and the first satellite designed to transmit telephone and high-speed data communications. Its name is still used to this day for a number of television broadcasting satellites.

1962 Chimney starter
 A chimney starter, also called a charcoal chimney, is a device that is used to start either lump charcoal or stacked charcoal briquettes on a grate. Although the chimney starter is now sometimes considered a "traditional" method of starting charcoal, a basic device used for barbecue grills was co-invented in 1962 by Hugh King, Lavaughn Johnson, and Garner Byars of Corinth, Mississippi and marketed under the "Auto Fire" label. A patent for the chimney starter was filed by its inventors on July 6, 1962 and issued in January 1965.

1962 Light-emitting diode

A light-emitting-diode (LED) is a semiconductor diode that emits light when an electric current is applied in the forward direction of the device, as in the simple LED circuit. The effect is a form of electroluminescence where incoherent and narrow-spectrum light is emitted from the p-n junction in a solid state material. The first practical visible-spectrum LED was invented in 1962 by Nick Holonyak Jr.

1962 Electret microphone

An electret microphone is a type of condenser microphone, which eliminates the need for a power supply by using a permanently charged material. Electret materials have been known since the 1920s, and were proposed as condenser microphone elements several times, but were considered impractical until the foil electret type was invented at Bell Laboratories in 1962 by James West, using a thin metallized Teflon foil. This became the most common type, used in many applications from high-quality recording and lavalier use to built-in microphones in small sound recording devices and telephones.

1962 Jet injector

A jet injector is a type of medical injecting syringe that uses a high-pressure narrow jet of the injection liquid instead of a hypodermic needle to penetrate the epidermis. The jet injector was invented by Aaron Ismach in 1962.

1962 Laser diode
 A laser diode is a laser where the active medium is a semiconductor similar to that found in a light-emitting diode. The most common and practical type of laser diode is formed from a p-n junction and powered by injected electric current. These devices are sometimes referred to as injection laser diodes to distinguish them from optically pumped laser diodes, which are more easily manufactured in the laboratory. The laser diode was invented in 1962 by Robert N. Hall.

1962 Glucose meter
 A glucose meter is a medical device for determining the approximate concentration of glucose in the blood. The first glucose meter was invented by Leland Clark and Ann Lyons at the Cincinnati Children's Hospital which was first known as a glucose enzyme electrode. The sensor worked by measuring the amount of oxygen consumed by the enzyme.

1963 Kicktail
 Kicktails are the upwards bent tips of a skateboard deck, today considered vital to a skateboard. The front kicktail is usually called the nose while the back kicktail is referred to as the tail. The kicktail was invented in 1963 by Larry Stevenson. U.S. patent #3,565,454 was filed on June 12, 1969 and issued to Stevenson on February 2, 1971.

1963 Computer mouse

In computing, a mouse is a pointing device that functions by detecting two-dimensional motion relative to its supporting surface. The mouse's motion typically translates into the motion of a pointer on a display, which allows for fine control of a Graphical User Interface. Douglas Engelbart invented the computer mouse at the Augmentation Research Center, funded by the Department of Defense's Advanced Research Projects Agency (now DARPA) in 1963. The first mouse was carved from wood and tracked motion via two wheels mounted on the bottom. Later on, a ball instead of two wheels was employed. The concept was soon overtaken by a modern and more technologically advanced optical mouse.

1963 BASIC

In computer programming, BASIC is a family of high-level programming languages. The original BASIC was invented in 1963 by John George Kemeny and Thomas Eugene Kurtz at Dartmouth College in New Hampshire to provide computer access to non-science students. At the time, nearly all use of computers required writing custom software, which was something only scientists and mathematicians tended to be able to do. The language and its variants became widespread on microcomputers in the late 1970s and 1980s.

1963 Balloon catheter
 A balloon catheter is a type of "soft" catheter with an inflatable "balloon" at its tip which is used during a catheterization procedure to enlarge a narrow opening or passage within the body. The deflated balloon catheter is positioned, then inflated to perform the necessary procedure, and deflated again in order to be removed. A common use includes angioplasty. In 1963, Dr. Thomas Fogarty invented and patented the balloon catheter.

1963 Geosynchronous satellite
 A geosynchronous satellite is a satellite whose orbital track on the Earth repeats regularly over points on the Earth over time. The world's first geosynchronous satellite, the Syncom II which was launched on a Delta rocket at NASA in 1963, was invented by Harold Rosen.

1964 Buffalo wings

A Buffalo wing, hot wing or wing is a chicken wing section (drumette or flat) that is traditionally fried unbreaded and then coated in sauce. Classic Buffalo-style chicken wing sauce is composed of a vinegar-based cayenne pepper hot sauce and butter. They are traditionally served with celery sticks and blue cheese dressing. Buffalo wings get their name from where they were invented, at the Anchor Bar in Buffalo, New York. In 1964, Teresa Bellissimo at the family-owned Anchor Bar, covered  chicken wings in her own special sauce and served them with a side of blue cheese and celery. In 1980, Frank Bellissimo, the husband of Teresa, told The New Yorker that her buffalo wings were invented out of necessity because the restaurant had gotten an overstock of chicken wings instead of other chicken parts that the couple didn't know what to do with. On the other hand, Dominic Bellissimo, the son of Frank and Teresa, disputed this story. Dominic claimed that the wings were an impromptu midnight snack that his mother created on his request while drinking with friends. Whatever the story, all of the Bellissimos have since died so there is no way to verify how buffalo wings were invented.

1964 Plasma display

A plasma display panel is a flat panel display common to large TV displays. Many tiny cells between two panels of glass hold an inert mixture of noble gases. The gas in the cells is electrically turned into a plasma which then excites phosphors to emit light. The monochrome plasma video display was co-invented in July 1964 at the University of Illinois at Urbana–Champaign by Donald Bitzer, H. Gene Slottow, and graduate student Robert Willson for the PLATO Computer System.

1964 Moog synthesizer
 The Moog synthesizer is an analog synthesizer without the use of a vacuum tube. A Moog synthesizer uses analog circuits and analog computer techniques to generate sound electronically. In 1964, Dr. Robert Moog invented the Moog synthesizer that has been used by recording artists such as Mick Jagger, The Beatles, The Monkees, and Stevie Wonder.

1964 8-track cartridge
 Stereo 8, commonly known as the eight-track cartridge or eight-track, is a magnetic tape sound recording technology. In 1964, William Lear invented the eight-track, which went on to become the most popular musical medium from the mid-1960s to the early 1980s.

1964 Permanent press
 A permanent press is a characteristic of fabric that has been chemically processed to resist wrinkles and hold its shape. This treatment has a lasting effect on the fabric, namely in shirts, trousers, and slacks. Permanent press was invented in 1964 by Ruth Rogan Benerito, research leader of the Physical Chemistry Research Group of the Cotton Chemical Reactions Laboratory.

1964 Carbon dioxide laser
 The carbon dioxide laser was one of the earliest gas lasers to be developed and is still one of the most useful. The carbon dioxide laser was invented by C. Kumar N. Patel of Bell Labs in 1964.

1964 Liquid crystal display (dynamic scattering mode)
 A liquid crystal display (LCD) is an electronically modulated optical device shaped into a thin, flat panel made up of any number of color or monochrome pixels filled with liquid crystals and arrayed in front of a light source or reflector. In 1964, George H. Heilmeier invented the dynamic scattering mode found in liquid crystal displays, wherein an electrical charge is applied which rearranges the molecules so that they scatter light.

1964 SQUID
 Superconducting Quantum Interference Devices are very sensitive magnetometers used to measure extremely small magnetic fields based on superconducting loops containing Josephson junctions. The DC SQUID was invented in 1964 by Arnold Silver, Robert Jaklevic, John Lambe, and James Mercereau of Ford Research Labs.

1964 Argon laser
 The argon laser is one of a family of ion lasers that use a noble gas as the active medium. The argon laser was invented by William Bridges in 1964.

1965 Adaptive equalizer (automatic)
 An automatic adaptive equalizer corrects distorted signals, greatly improving data performance and speed. All computer modems use equalizers. The automatic adaptive equalizer was invented in 1965 by Bell Laboratories electrical engineer Robert Lucky.

1965 Snowboarding

Snowboarding is a sport that involves descending a slope that is either partially or fully covered with snow on a snowboard attached to a rider's feet using a special boot set into a mounted binding. The development of snowboarding was inspired by skateboarding, surfing and skiing. The first snowboard, the Snurfer, was invented by Sherman Poppen in 1965. Snowboarding became a Winter Olympic Sport in 1998.

1965 Kevlar

Kevlar is the registered trademark for a light, strong para-aramid synthetic fiber. Typically it is spun into ropes or fabric sheets that can be used as such or as an ingredient in composite material components. Currently, Kevlar has many applications, ranging from bicycle tires and racing sails to body armor because of its high strength-to-weight ratio. Invented at DuPont in 1965 by Stephanie Kwolek, Kevlar was first commercially used in the early 1970s as a replacement for steel in racing tires.

1965 Hypertext

Hypertext most often refers to text on a computer that will lead the user to other, related information on demand. It is a relatively recent innovation to user interfaces, which overcomes some of the limitations of written text. Rather than remaining static like traditional text, hypertext makes possible a dynamic organization of information through links and connections called hyperlinks. Ted Nelson coined the words "hypertext" and "hypermedia" in 1965 and invented the Hypertext Editing System in 1968 at Brown University.

1965 Cordless telephone
 A cordless telephone is a telephone with a wireless handset that communicates via radio waves with a base station connected to a fixed telephone line, usually within a limited range of its base station. The base station is on the subscriber premises, and attaches to the telephone network the same way a corded telephone does. In 1965, an American woman named Teri Pall invented the cordless telephone. Due to difficulties of marketing, Pall never patented her invention. George Sweigert of Euclid, Ohio had more success, thus receiving a patent for the cordless telephone in 1969.

1965 Space pen
 The Space Pen, also known as the Zero Gravity Pen, is a pen that uses pressurized ink cartridges and is claimed to write in zero gravity, upside down, underwater, over wet and greasy paper, at any angle, and in extreme temperature ranges. The ballpoint is made from tungsten carbide and is precisely fitted in order to avoid leaks. A sliding float separates the ink from the pressurized gas. The thixotropic ink in the hermetically sealed and pressurized reservoir is claimed to write for three times longer than a standard ballpoint pen. In 1965, the space pen was invented and patented by Paul C. Fisher. After two years of testing at NASA, the space pen was first used during the Apollo 7 mission in 1968.

1965 Minicomputer
 A minicomputer is a class of multi-user computers that lies in the middle range of the computing spectrum, in between the largest multi-user systems and the smallest single-user systems. Wesley A. Clark and Charles Molnar co-invented the PDP-8 in 1965, the world's first minicomputer, using integrated circuit technology. Because of its relatively small size and its $18,000 price tag, Digital Equipment only sold several hundred units.

1965 Compact Disc
 The Compact Disc, or CD, is an optical disc used to store digital data, originally developed for storing digital audio. In 1965, James Russell acted upon his idea that the music industry needed a new medium whereby a gramophone record and the needle on a phonograph would no longer come into contact with one another. With an interest in lasers, Russell soon began his research in an optical system that would replace a phonograph's needle and replace it with a laser that would read codes in order to record and playback sound.  At 12 inches (30 cm) in diameter, Russell in 1970 had successfully invented and built the world's first compact disc that contained digitized codes etched onto the disc that could be read from a laser. After partnering with Digital Recording which was later acquired by Optical Recording Corporation, Russell and the parent company that he worked for, found it increasingly difficult to enforce and protect his patents from infringement by competitors such as Sony, Philips, and Time Warner who all profited from Russell's invention. The belief that Dutch and Japanese scientists "invented" the compact disc is a misconception in the sense that Philips and Sony used Russell's underlying technology in order to develop a disc more refined, practical, smaller and sophisticated. In 1982, Sony and Philips had commercially introduced the compact disc, twelve years after Russell had already created a working prototype in 1970. By 1986, Optical Recording decided to legally act by suing Sony, Phillips, and Time Warner. Two years later, the company came to a licensing settlement with Sony and soon thereafter, agreements with Phillips and others soon followed, including a June 1992 court ruling that required Time Warner to pay Optical Recording $30 million due to patent infringement.

1965 Chemical laser
 A chemical laser is a laser that obtains its energy from a chemical reaction. Chemical lasers can achieve continuous wave output with power reaching to megawatt levels. They are used in industry for cutting and drilling, and in military as directed-energy weapons. The first chemical laser was co-invented by Jerome V. V. Kasper and George C. Pimentel in 1965.

1966 Dynamic random access memory
 Dynamic random access memory is a type of random access memory that stores each bit of data in a separate capacitor within an integrated circuit. Since real capacitors leak charge, the information eventually fades unless the capacitor charge is refreshed periodically. Because of this refresh requirement, it is a dynamic memory as opposed to static random access memory and other static memory. In 1966 DRAM was invented by Robert Dennard at the IBM Thomas J. Watson Research Center.

1966 Thermosonic bonding
 Thermosonic Bonding is the most widely used wire bonding method to electrically connect silicon integrated circuits. It was introduced by Alexander Coucoulas in 1966. Owing to the reliability of a thermosonic bond, it is extensively used to connect the all important central processing unit (CPU) which are encapsulated integrated circuits that serve as the mainstay and "brains" of the computer.

1967 Backpack (internal frame)
 The internal frame backpack consists of strips of either metal or plastic that mold to one's back to provide a good fit, sometimes with additional metal stays to reinforce the frame. Usually a complex series of straps works with the frame to distribute the weight and hold it in place. The close fitting of the back section to the wearer's back allows the pack to be closely attached to the body, and gives a predictable movement of the load. The internal frame backpack was invented in 1967 by Greg Lowe, the founder of Lowepro.

1967 Light beer
Invented by Joseph L. Owades

1967 Calculator (hand-held)
 Invented by Jack Kilby in 1967, the hand-held calculator is a device for performing mathematical calculations, distinguished from a computer by having a limited problem solving ability and an interface optimized for interactive calculation rather than programming. Calculators can be hardware or software, and mechanical or electronic, and are often built into devices such as PDAs or mobile phones.

1968 Racquetball

Racquetball is a racquet sport played with a hollow rubber ball in an indoor or outdoor court. Joseph Sobek is credited with inventing the sport of racquetball in the Greenwich YMCA, though not with naming it. A professional tennis player and handball player, Sobek sought a fast-paced sport that was easy to learn and play. He designed the first strung paddle, devised a set of codified rules, and named his game "paddle rackets."

1968 Virtual reality

Virtual reality (VR) is a technology which allows a user to interact with a computer-simulated environment. Most current virtual reality environments are primarily visual experiences, displayed either on a computer screen or through special or stereoscopic displays, but some simulations include additional sensory information, such as sound through speakers or headphones. In 1968, Ivan Sutherland, with the help of his student Bob Sproull, invented what is widely considered to be the first virtual reality and augmented reality (AR) head mounted display (HMD) system. It was primitive both in terms of user interface and realism, and the HMD to be worn by the user was so heavy it had to be suspended from the ceiling, and the graphics comprising the virtual environment were simple wireframe model rooms. In 1989, Jaron Lanier, the founder of VPL Research popularized the concept of virtual reality with his "goggles n' gloves" system.

1968 Turtle Excluder Device
 A turtle excluder device is a specialized device that allows a captured sea turtle to escape when caught in a fisherman's net. They are used to catch sea turtles when bottom trawling is used by the commercial shrimp fishing industry. The first turtle excluder device was called the Georgia Jumper. It was invented in 1968 by American fisherman Sinkey Boone.

1968 Zipper (ride)
 Not to be confused with the 1893 invention with the same name, the "Zipper" is an amusement-thrill ride popular at carnivals and amusement parks in the United States, Canada, Australia, and New Zealand. It features strong vertical G-forces, numerous spins, and a noted sense of unpredictability. The ride's basic format is a long, rotating, oval boom with a cable around its edge that pulls 12 cars around the ride. The Zipper is designed to be transportable and assembled from site to site. The Zipper was invented in 1968 by Joseph Brown of Chance Morgan. Since this time, more than 200 rides have been built and distributed all over the world, making it one of the most mass-produced and modern-day rides of all time.

1969 Lunar Module

The Lunar Module was the lander portion of spacecraft built for the Apollo program by Grumman in order to achieve the transit from cislunar orbit to the surface and back. The module was also known as the LM from the manufacturer designation. NASA achieved the first test flight on January 22, 1968 using a Saturn V rocket. Six successful missions carried twelve astronauts, the first being Neil Armstrong and Buzz Aldrin on July 20, 1969, to surface of the Moon and safely back to Earth. Tom Kelly as a project engineer at Grumman, invented and successfully designed the Lunar Module.

1969 Electromagnetic lock
 An electromagnetic lock is a simple locking device that consists of an electromagnet and armature plate. By attaching the electromagnet to the door frame and the armature plate to the door, a current passing through the electromagnet attracts the armature plate holding the door shut. The first modern direct-pull electromagnetic lock was designed by Sumner "Irving" Saphirstein in 1969.

1969 Laser printer

A laser printer is a common type of computer printer that rapidly produces high quality text and graphics on plain paper. The laser printer was invented at Xerox in 1969 by researcher Gary Starkweather, who had an improved printer working by 1971 and incorporated into a fully functional networked printer system by about a year later.

1969 Bioactive glass

Bioactive glasses are a group of surface reactive glass-ceramics. The biocompatibility of these glasses has led them to be investigated extensively for use as implant materials in the human body to repair and replace diseased or damaged bone. Bioactive glass was invented in 1969 by Larry Hench and his colleagues at the University of Florida.

1969 Wide-body aircraft

A wide-body aircraft is a large airliner with two passenger aisles, also known as a twin-aisle aircraft. As the world's first wide-body aircraft, the Boeing 747, also referred to as a jumbo jet, revolutionized international travel around the globe by making non-stop and long distance travel accessible for all. Joe Sutter, the chief engineer of the jumbo jet program at The Boeing Company designed the world's first wide-body aircraft, the Boeing 747, with its first test flight on February 9, 1969.

1969 Taser

A Taser is an electroshock weapon that uses Electro-Muscular Disruption (EMD) technology to cause neuromuscular incapacitation (NMI) and strong muscle contractions through the involuntary stimulation of both the sensory nerves and the motor nerves. The Taser is not dependent on pain compliance, making it highly effective on subjects with high pain tolerance. For this reason it is preferred by law enforcement over traditional stun guns and other electronic control weapons. Jack Cover, a NASA researcher, invented the Taser in 1969.

1969 Charge coupled device

A charge-coupled device (CCD) is a device for the movement of electrical charge, usually from within the device to an area where the charge can be manipulated. This is achieved by "shifting" the signals between stages within the device one at a time. CCDs move charge between capacitive bins in the device, with the shift allowing for the transfer of charge between bins. Often the device is integrated with an image sensor, such as a photoelectric device to produce the charge that is being read, thus making the CCD a major technology for digital imaging. First conceived in its usefulness for computer memory, the charge coupled device was co-invented in 1969 by American physicist George E. Smith and Canadian physicist Willard Boyle at AT&T Bell Laboratories.

1969 Mousepad

A mousepad is a hard surface, square-shaped and rubberized mat for enhancing the usability of a computer mouse. Jack Kelley invented the mousepad in 1969.

1969 Chapman Stick

A polyphonic member of the guitar family, the Chapman Stick is an electric musical instrument used for music recordings to play various parts such as bass, lead, chords, and textures. The Chapman Stick looks like a wide version of the fretboard of an electric guitar, but having 8, 10 or 12 strings. The player will use both hands to sound notes by striking the strings against the fingerboard just behind the appropriate frets for the desired notes. The Chapman Stick was invented in 1969 by American jazz musician Emmett Chapman.

1969 Markup language
 A markup language is a modern system for annotating a text in a way that is syntactically distinguishable from that text. The idea and terminology evolved from the "marking up" of manuscripts. For example, the revision instructions by editors, traditionally written with a blue pencil on authors' manuscripts. A well-known example of a markup language in widespread use today is HyperText Markup Language (HTML), one of the key document formats of the World Wide Web. The origins of markup languages can be traced to a formatting language called RUNOFF, developed in the 1960s by Jerome H. Saltzer at the Massachusetts Institute of Technology. However, the very first markup language was called the Generalized Markup Language (GML) co-invented by IBM engineers Charles Goldfarb, Ed Mosher, and Ray Lorie.

1970s
1970 Wireless local area network
 A wireless local area network is the linking of two or more computers or devices using spread-spectrum or OFDM modulation technology based to enable communication between devices in a limited area. In 1970, the University of Hawaii, under the leadership of Norman Abramson, invented the world's first computer communication network using low-cost ham-like radios, named ALOHAnet. The bidirectional star topology of the system included seven computers deployed over four islands to communicate with the central computer on the Oahu Island without using phone lines.
1970 Surf leash
 A surfboard leash or leg rope is the cord that attaches a surfboard to the surfer. It prevents the surfboard from being swept away by waves and prevents a runaway surfboard from hitting other surfers and swimmers. Modern leashes comprise a urethane cord where one end has a band with a velcro strap attached to the surfer's trailing foot, and the opposite has a velcro strap attached to the tail end of the surfboard. The surfboard leash was invented in 1970 by Santa Cruz, California resident Pat O'Neill, son of wetsuit innovator Jack O'Neill, who fastened surgical tubing to the nose of his surfboard with a suction cup looped to the end of his wrist in order to leverage turns and cutbacks in the water. However, modifications in 1971 by O'Neill made the surf leash attached to the ankle and to a surfboard's tail, a practice still in use today.

1971 Uno (card game)
 Uno is a card game played with a specially printed deck. Using colored playing cards, he game involves playing the legal card with the highest point value. This is a simple way to minimize points held in the hand at the end of the round, but fails to account for the utility of holding wilds and draw fours near the end of the game. Uno was co-invented by father-son duo Merle and Ray Robbins in 1971 as a twist to the card game called Crazy Eights. The name of the game, "Uno", Spanish for one, was thought up by Merle's son Ray.

1971 Personal computer 

The personal computer (PC) is any computer whose original sales price, size, and capabilities make it useful for individuals, and which is intended to be operated directly by an end user, with no intervening computer operator. The Kenbak-1 is officially credited by the Computer History Museum to be the world's first personal computer which was invented in 1971 by John Blankenbaker. With a price tag of $750 and after selling only 40 machines, Kenbak Corporation closed its doors in 1973.

1971 Fuzzball router

Fuzzball routers were the first modern routers on the Internet. They were DEC LSI-11 computers loaded with router software. First conceptualized by its inventor, David L. Mills, fuzzball routers evolved as a virtual machine supporting the DEC RT-11 operating system and early developmental versions of the TCP/IP protocol and applications suite. Prototype versions of popular Internet tools, including Telnet, FTP, DNS, EGP and SMTP were first implemented and tested on fuzzball routers.

1971 Supercritical airfoil

A supercritical airfoil is an airfoil designed, primarily, to delay the onset of wave drag on aircraft in the transonic speed range. Supercritical airfoils are characterized by their flattened upper surface, highly cambered aft section, and greater leading edge radius as compared to traditional airfoil shapes. The supercritical airfoil was invented and designed by NASA aeronautical engineer Richard Whitcomb in the 1960s. Testing successfully commenced on a United States Navy Vought F-8U fighter through wind tunnel results in 1971.

1971 Microprocessor

The microprocessor is a computer chip that processes instructions and communicates with outside devices, controlling most of the operations of a computer through the central processing unit on a single integrated circuit. The first commercially available microprocessor was a silicon-based chip, the Intel 4004, co-invented in 1971 by Ted Hoff, Federico Faggin, Masatoshi Shima and Stanley Mazor for a calculator company named Busicom, and produced by Intel.

1971 Floppy disk

A floppy disk is a data storage medium that is composed of a disk of thin, flexible "floppy" magnetic storage medium encased in a square or rectangular plastic shell. In 1971 while working at IBM, David L. Noble invented the 8-inch floppy disk. Floppy disks in 8-inch, 5¼-inch, and 3½-inch formats enjoyed many years as a popular and ubiquitous form of data storage and exchange, from the mid-1970s to the late 1990s.

1971 String trimmer

A string trimmer is a powered handheld device that uses a flexible monofilament line instead of a blade for cutting grass and trimming other plants near objects. It consists of a cutting head at the end of a long shaft with a handle or handles and sometimes a shoulder strap. String trimmers powered by an internal combustion engine have the engine on the opposite end of the shaft from the cutting head while electric string trimmers typically have an electric motor in the cutting head. Used frequently in lawn and garden care, the string trimmer is more popularly known by the brandnames Weedeater or Weedwhacker. The string trimmer was invented in 1971 by George Ballas of Houston, Texas.

1971 Memristor
 A memristor is a passive two-terminal electronic device that is built to express only the property of memristance. However, in practice it may be difficult to build a 'pure memristor,' since a real device may also have a small amount of some other property, such as capacitance. In 1971, American engineer and computer scientist Leon Chua first postulated the memristor that could be used to implement computer memory. Almost four decades after Chua's research, a team of engineers at Hewlett Packard under the direction of R. Stanley Williams constructed a working memristor using a thin film of titanium dioxide in April 2008.

1971 E-mail

Electronic mail, often shortened to e-mail, is a method of creating, transmitting, or storing primarily text-based human communications with digital communications systems. Ray Tomlinson as a programmer while working on the United States Department of Defense's ARPANET, invented and sent the first electronic mail on a time-sharing computer in 1971. Previously, e-mail could only be sent to users on the same computer. Tomlinson is regarded as having sent the first e-mail on a network and for making the "@" sign the mainstream of e-mail communications.

1972 C (programming language)

C is a general-purpose computer programming language originally invented in 1972 by Dennis Ritchie at the Bell Telephone Laboratories in order to implement the Unix operating system. Although C was designed for writing architecturally independent system software, it is also widely used for developing application software.

1972 Video game console

A video game console is an interactive entertainment computer or electronic device that produces a video display signal which can be used with a display device such as a television to display a video game. A joystick or control pad is often used to simulate and play the video game. It was not until 1972 that Magnavox released the first home video game console, the Magnavox Odyssey, invented by Ralph H. Baer.

1972 Global Positioning System

The Global Positioning System (GPS) is a space-based global navigation satellite system that provides reliable, three-dimensional positioning, navigation, and timing services to worldwide users on a continuous basis in all weather, day and night, anywhere on or near the Earth. 24 satellites orbit around the Earth twice a day, transmitting signaled information to GPS receivers that take this information and use triangulation to calculate the user's exact location. Ultimately, the GPS is the descendant of the United States Navy's Timation satellite program and the United States Air Force's 621-B satellite program. The invention of GPS was a collaborative and team effort. The basic architecture of GPS was devised in less than a month in 1972 by Colonel Bradford Parkinson, Mel Birnbaum, Bob Rennard, and Jim Spilker. However, Richard Easton, a son of Roger Easton who was the head of the U.S. Navy's Timation program, claims that his father invented GPS and filed U.S. patent #3,789,409 in 1974. Other names listed by Richard Easton are James Buisson, Thomas McCaskill, Don Lynch, Charles Bartholomew, Randolph Zwirn and, "an important outsider," Robert Kern. Ivan Getting, while working at Raytheon, envisioned a satellite system similar to MOSAIC, a railroad mobile ballistic missile guidance system, but working more like LORAN. The GPS program was approved in December 1973, the first GPS satellite was launched in 1978, and by August 1993, 24 GPS satellites were in orbit. Initial operational capability was established in December of that same year while in February 1994, the Federal Aviation Agency (FAA) declared GPS ready for use.

1972 PET scanner
 A PET scanner is a commonly used medical device which scans the whole human body for detecting diseases such as cancer. The PET scanner was invented in 1972 by Edward J. Hoffman and fellow scientist Michael Phelps.

1972 Magnetic resonance imaging
 Magnetic resonance imaging (MRI), or nuclear magnetic resonance imaging (NMRI), is primarily a medical imaging technique most commonly used in radiology to visualize the structure and function of the body. Dr. Raymond Damadian, an Armenian-American scientist, who while researching the analytical properties of magnetic resonance, created the world's first magnetic resonance imaging machine in 1972. Damadian filed the first patent for an MRI machine, U.S. patent #3,789,832 on March 17, 1972, which was later issued to him on February 5, 1974. Damadian along with Larry Minkoff and Michael Goldsmith, subsequently went on to perform the first MRI body scan of a human being on July 3, 1977. Reflecting the fundamental importance and applicability of MRI in medicine, Paul Lauterbur of the University of Illinois at Urbana–Champaign and Sir Peter Mansfield of the University of Nottingham were awarded the 2003 Nobel Prize in Physiology or Medicine for their "discoveries concerning magnetic resonance imaging."

1973 Personal watercraft

A personal watercraft (PWC) is a recreational watercraft that the rider sits or stands on, rather than inside of, as in a boat. Models have an inboard engine driving a pump jet that has a screw-shaped impeller to create thrust for propulsion and steering. Clayton Jacobson II is credited with inventing the personal watercraft, including both the sit-down and stand-up models in 1973.

1973 E-paper

Electronic paper, also called e-paper, is a display technology designed to mimic the appearance of ordinary ink on paper. Electronic paper reflects light like ordinary paper and is capable of holding text and images indefinitely without drawing electricity, while allowing the image to be changed later. Applications of e-paper technology include e-book readers capable of displaying digital versions of books, magazines and newspapers, electronic pricing labels in retail shops, time tables at bus stations, and electronic billboards. Electronic paper was invented in 1973 by Nick Sheridon at Xerox's Palo Alto Research Center. The first electronic paper, called Gyricon, consisted of polyethylene spheres between 75 and 106 micrometres across.

1973 Recombinant DNA
 Recombinant DNA is a form of synthetic DNA that is engineered through the combination or insertion of one or more DNA strands, thereby combining DNA sequences that would not normally occur together. The Recombinant DNA technique was engineered by Stanley Norman Cohen and Herbert Boyer in 1973. They published their findings in a 1974 paper entitled "Construction of Biologically Functional Bacterial Plasmids in vitro", which described a technique to isolate and amplify genes or DNA segments and insert them into another cell with precision, creating a transgenic bacterium.

1973 Catalytic converter (three-way)
 A catalytic converter provides an environment for a chemical reaction wherein toxic combustion by-products are converted to less-toxic substances. First used on cars in 1975 to lower emission standards, catalytic converters are also used on generator sets, forklifts, mining equipment, trucks, buses, trains, and other engine-equipped machines. The three-way catalytic converter was co-invented by John J. Mooney and Carl D. Keith at the Engelhard Corporation in 1973.

1973 Mobile phone

A mobile phone, or cell phone, is a long-range, electronic device used for mobile voice or data communication over a network of specialized base stations known as cell sites. Early mobile FM radio telephones were in use for many years, but since the number of radio frequencies were very limited in any area, the number of phone calls were also very limited. To solve this problem, there could be many small areas called cells which share the same frequencies. When users moved from one area to another while calling, the call would have to be switched over automatically without losing the call. In this system, a small number of radio frequencies could accommodate a huge number of calls. The first mobile call was made from a car phone in St. Louis, Missouri on June 17, 1946, but the system was impractical from what is considered a portable handset today. The equipment weighed 80 lbs, and the AT&T service, basically a massive party line, cost $30 per month plus 30 to 40 cents per local call. The basic network and supporting infrastructure of hexagonal cells used to support a mobile telephony system while remaining on the same channel were devised by Douglas H. Ring and W. Rae Young at AT&T Bell Labs in 1947. Finally in 1973, Martin Cooper invented the first handheld cellular/mobile phone. His first mobile phone call was made to Joel S. Engel in April 1973.

1973 Voicemail
 Voicemail is the managing of telephone messages from a centralized data storing system. Voicemail is stored on hard disk drives, media generally used by computers in order to store other forms of data. Messages are recorded in digitized natural human voice similar to how music is stored on a compact disc. To retrieve and to play back messages, a user calls the system from any phone, and his or her messages can be retrieved immediately. The first voicemail system, known as the Speech Filing System (SFS), was invented by Stephen J. Boies in 1973. What started as a research project at the IBM Thomas J. Watson Research Center, the first working prototype became available to telephone users in 1975.

1974 Heimlich maneuver
 Performing abdominal thrusts, better known as the Heimlich Maneuver, involves a rescuer standing behind a patient and using their hands to exert pressure on the bottom of the diaphragm. This compresses the lungs and exerts pressure on any object lodged in the trachea, hopefully expelling it. This amounts to an artificial cough. Henry Heimlich, as the inventor of his abdominal thrust technique, first published his findings about the maneuver in a June 1974 informal article in Emergency Medicine entitled, "Pop Goes the Cafe Coronary". On June 19, 1974, the Seattle Post-Intelligencer reported that retired restaurant-owner Isaac Piha used the procedure to rescue choking victim Irene Bogachus in Bellevue, Washington.

1974 Post-it note
 The Post-it note is a piece of stationery with a re-adherable strip of adhesive on the back, designed for temporarily attaching notes to documents and to other surfaces such as walls, desks and table-tops, computer displays, and so forth. Post-it notes were co-invented by 3M employees Arthur Fry and Spencer Silver in 1974.

1974 Scanning acoustic microscope
 A Scanning Acoustic Microscope (SAM) is a device which uses focused sound to investigate, measure, or image an object. It is commonly used in failure analysis and non-destructive evaluation. The first scanning acoustic microscope was co-invented in 1974 by C. F. Lemons and R. A. Quate at the Microwave Laboratory of Stanford University.

1974 Quantum well laser
 A quantum well laser is a laser diode in which the active region of the device is so narrow that quantum confinement occurs. The wavelength of the light emitted by a quantum well laser is determined by the width of the active region rather than just the bandgap of the material from which it is constructed. The quantum well laser was invented by Charles H. Henry, a physicist at Bell Labs, in 1974 and was granted a patent for it in 1976.

1974 Universal Product Code
 The Universal Product Code (UPC) is a barcode symbology that scans 12-digits numbers along the bar in order to track trade items and to encode information such as pricing to a product on a store's shelf. The Universal Product Code, invented by George Laurer at IBM, was used on a marked item scanned at a retail checkout, Marsh's supermarket in Troy, Ohio, at 8:01 a.m. on June 26, 1974.

1975 Digital camera

The digital camera is a camera that takes video or still photographs, digitally by recording images via an electronic image sensor. Steven Sasson as an engineer at Eastman Kodak invented and built the first digital camera using a CCD image sensor in 1975.

1975 Ethernet

The ethernet is a family of frame-based computer networking technologies for local area networks (LANs). The name comes from the physical concept of the ether. It defines a number of wiring and signaling standards for the Physical Layer of the OSI networking model, through means of network access at the Media Access Control (MAC)/Data Link Layer, and a common addressing format. Robert Metcalfe, while at Xerox invented the ethernet in 1975.

1975 Breakaway rim

A breakaway rim is a basketball hoop that can bend slightly when a player dunks a basketball, and then instantly snap back into its original shape when the player releases it. It allows players to dunk the ball without shattering the backboard, and it reduces the possibility of wrist injuries. According to the Lemelson Center, an affiliation of the Smithsonian Institution in Washington D.C., the breakaway rim was invented by Arthur Ehrat. After six years, from July 1976 to December 1982, Ehrat received a patent (U.S. Patent No. 4,365,802). His application was rejected twice, with patent examiner Paul Shapiro noting that Frederick C. Tyner held a patent for a similar device (U.S. Patent No. 4,111,420). However, a court appeal finally ruled in favor of Ehrat, as he proved through notarized copies of canceled checks and a rough sketch of his invention, that he was working on his breakaway basketball goal in 1975 before Frederick Tyner conceived of his.

1976 Gore-Tex
 Gore-Tex is a waterproof, breathable fabric and is made using an emulsion polymerization process with the fluorosurfactant perfluorooctanoic acid. Gore-Tex was co-invented by Wilbert L. Gore, Rowena Taylor, and Gore's son, Robert W. Gore for use in space. Robert Gore was granted a patent on April 27, 1976, for a porous form of polytetrafluoroethylene with a micro-structure characterized by nodes interconnected by fibrils. Robert Gore, Rowena Taylor, and Samuel Allen were granted a patent on March 18, 1980 for a "waterproof laminate."

1977 Human-powered aircraft
 A human-powered aircraft (HPA) is an aircraft powered by direct human energy and the force of gravity. The thrust provided by the human may be the only source. However, a hang glider that is partially powered by pilot power is a human-powered aircraft where the flight path can be enhanced more than if the hang glider had not been assisted by human power. Invented by designer Paul MacCready and constructed of mylar, polystyrene, and carbon-fiber rods, the Gossamer Condor was the world's first practical and successful human-powered aircraft, staying in the air for 7.5 uninterrupted minutes. By 1979, a cyclist named Byron Allen used McCready's successive model known as the Gossamer Albatross, and won British industrialist Henry Kremer's prize of $214,000 for crossing the 22-mile English Channel.

1977 Chemical oxygen iodine laser
 A chemical oxygen iodine laser is an infrared chemical laser. The chemical oxygen iodine laser was invented by the United States Air Force's Phillips Laboratory in 1977 for military purposes. Its properties make it useful for industrial processing as well; the beam is focusable and can be transferred by an optical fiber, as its wavelength is not absorbed much by fused silica but is very well absorbed by metals, making it suitable for laser cutting and drilling. COIL is the main weapon laser for the military airborne laser and advanced tactical laser programs.

1978 Slide Away Bed
 A Slide Away Bed is a type of sofa bed that slides to the wall to form a sofa. The mattress is hinged to form a seating surface and back support. The bed frame support is a telescoping frame that allows the bed platform to recess below the seating cushion. The primitive version of the slide away bed was co-invented by Manning Lane, Warren J. Hauck and Roy O. Sweeney of Cincinnati, Ohio. U.S. patent #4,204,287 was filed on September 5, 1978 and issued on May 27, 1980.

1978 Popcorn bag
 A popcorn bag is a specially designed, microwaveable bag that contains popcorn, along with oil, spices and seasoning. The bag is typically partially folded when it is placed in a microwave oven, and inflates as a result of steam pressure from the heated kernels. The earliest patent for the popcorn bag, U.S. patent #4,267,420 was filed on October 12, 1978 by William A. Brastad of Minneapolis and issued on May 12, 1981.

1978 Bulletin board system
 A Bulletin Board System, or BBS, is a computer system running software that allows users to connect and log into the system using a terminal program. Once logged in, a user can perform functions such as uploading and downloading software and data, reading news and bulletins, and exchanging messages with other users, either through electronic mail or in public message boards. Many BBSes also offer on-line games, in which users can compete with each other, and BBSes with multiple phone lines often provide chat rooms, allowing users to interact with each other. CBBS, the first Bulletin Board System, was invented by Ward Christensen and Randy Suess in Chicago, becoming fully operational on February 16, 1978.

1979 Winglets

Wingtip devices or winglets are usually intended to improve the efficiency of fixed-wing aircraft. The concept of winglets originated in the late 19th century, but the idea remained on the drawing board. Throughout the 1970s when the price of aviation fuel started spiraling upward, NASA aeronautical engineer Richard Whitcomb began investigating and studying the feasibility of winglets in order to improve overall aerodynamics and reduce drag on aircraft. Whitcomb's tests finally culminated with the first successful test flight of his attached winglets on a KC-135 Stratotanker on July 24, 1979.

1979 Polar fleece

Polar fleece, or "fleece", is a soft napped insulating synthetic wool fabric made from polyethylene terephthalate or other synthetic fibers. Found in jackets, hoodies, and casual wear, fleece has some of wool's finest qualities but weighs a fraction of the lightest available woolens. The first form of polar fleece was invented in 1979 by Malden Mills, now Polartec LLC., which was a new, light, and strong pile fabric meant to mimic and in some ways surpass wool.

1980s and the early 1990s (1980–1991)
 
1981 Stealth-aircraft
 The Lockheed F-117 Nighthawk was the world's first operational aircraft to be designed around stealth technology. Its maiden flight took place in 1981, and the aircraft achieved initial operating capability status in 1983.

1981 Control-Alt-Delete
 Control-Alt-Delete, often abbreviated as Ctrl-Alt-Del, is a computer keyboard command on PC compatible systems that can be used to reboot a computer, and summon the task manager or operating system. It is invoked by pressing the Delete key while holding the Control and Alt keys: Ctrl+Alt+Delete. Thus, it forces a soft reboot, brings up the task manager (on Windows and BeOS) or a jump to ROM monitor. Control-Alt-Delete was invented in 1981 by David Bradley while working at IBM.

1981 Total internal reflection fluorescence microscope
 A total internal reflection fluorescence microscope is a type of microscope with which a thin region of a specimen, usually less than 200 nm, can be observed. It can also be used to observe the fluorescence of a single molecule, making it an important tool of biophysics and quantitative biology. Daniel Axelrod invented the first total internal reflection fluorescence microscope in 1981.

1981 Space Shuttle

The Space Shuttle, part of the Space Transportation System (STS), is a spacecraft operated by NASA for orbital human spaceflight missions. It carries payloads to low Earth orbit, provides crew rotation for the International Space Station (ISS), and performs servicing missions. The orbiter can also recover satellites and other payloads from orbit and return them to Earth. In 1981, NASA successfully launched its reusable spacecraft called the Space Shuttle. George Mueller, an American from St. Louis, Missouri is widely credited for jump starting, designing, and overseeing the Space Shuttle program after the demise of the Apollo program in 1972.

1981 Paintball

Paintball is a game in which players eliminate opponents by hitting them with pellets containing paint usually shot from a carbon dioxide or compressed-gas, HPA or N2O, in a powered paintball gun. The idea of the game was first conceived and co-invented in 1976 by Hayes Noel, Bob Gurnsey, and Charles Gaines. However, the game of paintball was not first played until June 27, 1981.

1981 Graphic User Interface

Short for Graphic User Interface, the GUI uses windows, icons, and menus to carry out commands such as opening files, deleting files, moving files, etc. and although many GUI Operating Systems are operated by using a mouse, the keyboard can also be used by using keyboard shortcuts or arrow keys. The GUI was co-invented at Xerox PARC by Alan Kay and Douglas Engelbart in 1981.

1983 Internet

Not to be confused with a separate application known as the World Wide Web which was invented much later in the early 1990s (see article on the English inventor Tim Berners-Lee), the Internet is the global system of overall interconnected computer networks that use the standardized Internet Protocol Suite (TCP/IP) to serve billions of users worldwide. It is a network of networks that consists of millions of private and public, academic, business, and government networks of local to global scope that are linked by copper wires, fiber-optic cables, wireless connections, and other technologies. The concept of packet switching of a network was first explored by Paul Baran in the early 1960s, and the mathematical formulations behind packet switching were later devised by Leonard Kleinrock. On October 29, 1969, the world's first electronic computer network, the ARPANET, was established between nodes at Leonard Kleinrock's lab at UCLA and Douglas Engelbart's lab at the Stanford Research Institute (now SRI International). Another milestone occurred in 1973 when Bob Kahn and Vinton Cerf co-invented Internet Protocol and Transmission Control Protocol while working on ARPANET at the United States Department of Defense. The first TCP/IP-wide area network was operational on January 1, 1983, when the United States' National Science Foundation (NSF) constructed the university network backbone that would later become the NSFNet. This date is held as the "birth" of the Internet.

1983 Blind signature
 In cryptography, a blind signature, as invented by David Chaum in 1983, is a form of digital signature in which the content of a message is disguised before it is signed. The resulting blind signature can be publicly verified against the original, unblinded message in the manner of a regular digital signature. Blind signatures are typically employed in privacy-related protocols where the signer and message author are different parties. Examples include cryptographic election systems and digital cash schemes.

1983 Laser turntable
 A laser turntable is a phonograph that plays gramophone records using a laser beam as the pickup instead of a conventional diamond-tipped stylus. This playback system has the unique advantage of avoiding physical contact with the record during playback; instead, a focused beam of light traces the signal undulations in the vinyl, with zero friction, mass and record wear. The laser turntable was first conceived by Robert S. Reis, while working as a consultant of analog signal processing for the United States Air Force and the United States Department of Defense.

1984 LCD projector
 An LCD projector is a type of video projector for displaying video, images or computer data on a screen or other flat surface. It is a modern equivalent of the slide projector or overhead projector. To display images, LCD (liquid-crystal display) projectors typically send light from a metal-halide lamp through a prism or series of dichroic filters that separates light to three polysilicon panels – one each for the red, green and blue components of the video signal. The LCD projector was invented in 1984 by Gene Dolgoff.

1984 Pointing stick
 The pointing stick is an isometric joystick operated by applied force and is used as a pointing device on laptop computers. It takes the form of a rubber cap located on top of the keyboard embedded between the 'G', 'H' and 'B' keys. The pointing stick was invented by American computer scientist Ted Selker in 1984.

1984 Polymerase chain reaction
 The polymerase chain reaction (PCR) is a technique widely used in molecular biology. It derives its name from one of its key components, a DNA polymerase used to amplify a piece of DNA by in vitro enzymatic DNA replication. As PCR progresses, the DNA generated is used as a template for replication. The polymerase chain reaction was invented in 1984 by Kary Mullis.

1986 Atomic force microscope
 An atomic force microscope is a type of microscope that is used for imaging, measuring, and manipulating matter at the nanoscale. The information is gathered by "feeling" the surface with a mechanical probe. Piezoelectric elements that facilitate tiny but accurate and precise movements on (electronic) command enable the very precise scanning. The atomic force microscope was co-invented in 1986 by Christoph Gerber, Gerd Binning, and Calvin Quate. On April 20, 1987, Gerber, Binning, and Quate filed U.S. patent #4,762,996 for the device which was later issued to them on August 9, 1988.

1986 Stereolithography
 Stereolithography is a common rapid manufacturing and rapid prototyping technology for producing parts with high accuracy and good surface finish by utilizing a vat of liquid UV-curable photopolymer "resin" and a UV laser to build parts a layer at a time. Stereolithography was invented by Chuck Hull in 1986.

1987 Digital Micromirror Device
 The Digital Micromirror Device (DMD) is a silicon chip of up to 2 million hinged microscopic aluminum mirrors all under digital control that tilt thousands of times per second in order to create an image by directing digital pulses through a projection lens and onto a television or movie theatre screen. The Digital Micromirror Device was invented by Dr. Larry Hornbeck while working at Texas Instruments, also holding several patents relating to DMD technology.

1987 Perl
 Perl is a high-level, general-purpose, interpreted, dynamic programming language. It was originally invented by Larry Wall, a linguist working as a systems administrator for NASA, in 1987, as a general purpose Unix scripting language to make report processing easier. Perl is also used for text processing, system administration, web application development, bioinformatics, network programming, applications that require database access, graphics programming etc.

1988 Luggage (tilt-and-roll)

Tilt-and-roll luggage or wheeled luggage, is a variant of luggage for travelers which typically contains two-fixed wheels on one end and a telescoping handle on the opposite end for vertical movement. Tilt-and-roll luggage is pulled and thus eliminates a traveler from directly carrying his or her luggage. In 1988, Northwest Airlines pilot Robert Plath invented tilt-and-roll luggage as travelers beforehand had to carry suitcases in their hands, toss garment bags over their shoulders, or strap luggage on top of metal carts.

1988 Fused deposition modeling
Fused deposition modeling, which is often referred to by its initials FDM, is a type of additive fabrication or technology commonly used within engineering design. FDM works on an "additive" principle by laying down material in layers. Fusion deposition modeling was invented by S. Scott Crump in 1988.

1988 Tcl
Tcl, known as "Tool Command Language", is a scripting language most commonly used for rapid prototyping, scripted applications, GUIs and testing. Tcl is used extensively on embedded systems platforms, both in its full form and in several other small-footprinted versions. Tcl is also used for CGI scripting. Tcl was invented in the spring of 1988 by John Ousterhout while working at the University of California, Berkeley.

1988 Ballistic electron emission microscopy
Ballistic electron emission microscopy or BEEM is a technique for studying ballistic electron transport through variety of materials and material interfaces. BEEM is a three terminal scanning tunneling microscopy (STM) technique that was co-invented in 1988 at the Jet Propulsion Laboratory in Pasadena California by L. Douglas Bell and William Kaiser.

1988 Electron beam ion trap
 The electron beam ion trap is used in physics to denote an electromagnetic bottle that produces and confines highly charged ions. The electron beam ion trap was co-invented by M. Levine and R. Marrs in 1988.

1988 Nicotine patch
 A nicotine patch is a transdermal patch that releases nicotine into the body through the skin. It is usually used as a method to quit smoking. The nicotine patch was invented in 1988 by Murray Jarvik, Jed Rose and Daniel Rose.

1988 Firewall
 A firewall is an integrated collection of security measures designed to prevent unauthorized electronic access to a networked computer system. At AT&T Bell Labs, William Cheswick and Steven M. Bellovin were continuing their research in packet filtering and co-invented a working model for their own company based upon their original first generation architecture of a firewall.

1988 Resin identification code
 The SPI resin identification coding system is a set of symbols placed on plastics to identify the polymer type. The resin identification code was developed by the Society of the Plastics Industry (SPI) in 1988.

1989 ZIP file format
 The ZIP file format is a data compression and file archiver. A ZIP file contains one or more files that have been compressed to reduce file size, or stored as-is. The zip file format was originally invented in 1989 by Phil Katz for PKZIP, and evolved from the previous ARC compression format by Thom Henderson.

1989 Selective laser sintering
 Selective laser sintering is an additive rapid manufacturing technique that uses a high power laser to fuse small particles of plastic, metal, ceramic, or glass powders into a mass representing a desired 3-dimensional object. The laser selectively fuses powdered material by scanning cross-sections generated from a 3-D digital description of the part on the surface of a powder bed. Selective laser sintering was invented and patented by Dr. Carl Deckard at the University of Texas at Austin in 1989.

1990 Sulfur lamp
 The sulfur lamp is a highly efficient full-spectrumelectrodeless lighting system whose light is generated by sulfur plasma that has been excited by microwave radiation. The sulfur lamp consists of a golf ball-sized (30 mm) fused-quartz bulb containing several milligrams of sulfur powder and argon gas at the end of a thin glass spindle. The bulb is enclosed in a microwave-resonant wire-mesh cage. The technology was conceived by engineer Michael Ury, physicist Charles Wood and their colleagues in 1990. With support from the United States Department of Energy, it was further developed in 1994 by Fusion Lighting of Rockville, Maryland, a spinoff of the Fusion UV division of Fusion Systems Corporation.

1991 Ant robotics
 Ant robotics is a special case of swarm robotics. Swarm robots are simple and cheap robots with limited sensing and computational capabilities. This makes it feasible to deploy teams of swarm robots and take advantage of the resulting fault tolerance and parallelism. In 1991, American electrical engineer James McLurkin was the first to conceptualize the idea of "robot ants" while working at the MIT Computer Science and Artificial Intelligence Laboratory at the Massachusetts Institute of Technology. The robots consisted of sensors, infrared emitters, and communication systems capable of detecting objects in their path. McLurkin's invention was through studying the behavior of real ants in ant colonies and keeping ant farms as a basis for his programming. Through this examination, he could better understand how insects structured their workloads in order to produce a viable and working prototype of robotic ants.

See also

Timelines of United States inventions
Timeline of United States inventions (before 1890)
Timeline of United States inventions (1890–1945)
Timeline of United States inventions (after 1991)

Related topics
History of United States patent law
Lemelson Foundation
Lemelson–MIT Prize
List of African American inventors and scientists
List of Puerto Ricans
List of inventors
List of inventors killed by their own inventions
List of prolific inventors
List of Puerto Ricans in the United States Space Program
Military invention
NASA spinoff
National Inventors Hall of Fame
Native American contributions
Science and technology in the United States
Technological and industrial history of the United States
Timeline of United States discoveries
United States Patent and Trademark Office
United States patent law
Yankee ingenuity

Footnotes

Further reading
 Deitch, Joanne Weisman, "A Nation of Inventors", Carlisle, Massachusetts: Discovery Enterprises Limited, 2001
 Haven, Kendall, "100 Greatest Science Inventions of All Time", Westport, Connecticut: Libraries Unlimited, 2006
 Hopping-Egan, Lorraine, "Inventors and Inventions", New York City, New York: Scholastic, Incorporated, 1997
 Ngeow, Evelyn, "Inventors and Inventions", New York City, New York: Marshall Cavendish Corporation, 2008
 Philbin, Tom, "The 100 Greatest Inventions of All Time", New York City, New York: Kensington Publishing Corporation, 2003

External links
 American Inventors
 Google: U.S. Patents Search
 PBS: They Made America
 MIT: Invention Dimension
 NASA: Scientific and Technical Information: NASA Spinoff 
 National Inventors Hall of Fame Foundation
 The Great Idea Finder 
 United States Patent and Trademark Office

Timeline Of United States Inventions 1946 1991
List of United States inventions and discoveries
United States
United States inventions
Inventions 1946 1991